Vilovo is a rural locality (a village) in Rameshkovsky District of Tver Oblast, Russia.  Municipally, it is a part of Aleshino Rural Settlement of Rameshkovsky Municipal District.

References

Rural localities in Rameshkovsky District